Earl-Jean Reavis (née McCrea;  born 1942) is an American former pop and R&B singer, who was a member of the vocal group, the Cookies. Credited as Earl-Jean, she had a solo hit with the original version of "I'm into Something Good", written by Gerry Goffin and Carole King, and later a bigger hit for Herman's Hermits.

Early life
Reavis was born in Brooklyn, New York, United States, but lived with her family in North Carolina from the age of two. They returned to Brooklyn to live in Coney Island when she was a young teenager, where she attended Lincoln High School. In 1960, she married Grant Reavis, and had a child. Gerry Goffin and Earl-Jean McCrea (aka Jeanie Reavis) had a daughter together, while Goffin and King were still working together, as author Sheila Weller said in her book Girls Like Us, which chronicles the lives of King, Joni Mitchell and Carly Simon.

Career
Reavis's older sister, Darlene McCrea, and the other original members of the Cookies - a group first formed in 1954 - eventually evolved into Ray Charles' backing group, the Raelettes. In 1961, Earl-Jean was persuaded to join a new version of the Cookies. The group was signed to Goffin and King's Dimension record label in 1962, and scored hits with "Don't Say Nothin' Bad (About My Baby)", and "Chains" (later covered by the Beatles).

She left the Cookies, and signed for Colpix, where she recorded the Goffin and King song "I'm into Something Good" (Colpix CP 729), which reached no. 38 in the United States on the Billboard Hot 100. Later that year in Britain, a cover version by Herman's Hermits topped the charts. She recorded a follow-up single in 1964, again written by Goffin and King, called "Randy" (Colpix CP 748) but it failed to reach the chart listings.

She later worked as a specialist in early childhood, and opened a day care center.

References

External Links
 

1942 births
Living people
Abraham Lincoln High School (Brooklyn) alumni
American women pop singers
Colpix Records artists
Musicians from Brooklyn
American rhythm and blues singers
People from Coney Island
Singers from New York City
Singers from North Carolina
20th-century American women singers
20th-century American singers
21st-century American women
The Cookies members